2'-5' oligoadenylate synthetase-like 2 is a protein that in the house mouse is encoded by the Oasl2 gene. The gene is also known as Oasl, M1204 and Mmu-OASL. Oasl2 is a paralogue of Oasl1.

Model organisms
				
A conditional knockout mouse line, called Oasl2tm1a(EUCOMM)Wtsi was generated as part of the International Knockout Mouse Consortium program — a high-throughput mutagenesis project to generate and distribute animal models of disease to interested scientists — at the Wellcome Trust Sanger Institute.

Male and female animals underwent a standardized phenotypic screen to determine the effects of deletion. Twenty two tests were carried out on mutant mice, but no significant abnormalities were observed.

References

Further reading 
 

Mouse proteins
Genes mutated in mice